Mel Johnson may refer to:

Mel Johnson (born 1942), Australian cricketer
Mel Johnson Jr., American actor
Melvin Johnson (1909–1965), American firearms designer
Melvin Johnson III (born 1990), American basketball player
Melvin Johnson (American football) (born 1972), American football player
Melvin Johnson (serial killer) (1958–2003), American serial killer
Melvin N. Johnson, American academic administrator